John Emmett "Boozer" Pitts Sr. (November 25, 1893 – February 10, 1971) was an American football player and coach. He served as the head football coach at Auburn University from 1923 to 1924 and again for the final seven games of the 1927 season, compiling a career record of 7–11–6. He was also a professor of mathematics at Auburn in the 1930s.

Playing career
A native of Pittsview, Alabama, Pitts was a prominent center for coach Mike Donahue's Auburn Tigers football team in 1913 and 1914. He entered Auburn at the age of 15, having only read about football. Pitts was selected All-Southern and was a member of an All-time Auburn Tigers football team selected in 1935, as well as coach Donahue's all-time Auburn team. One writer claims "Auburn had a lot of great football teams, but there may not have been one greater than the 1913–1914 team." Pitts weighed some 190 pounds.

Army
Pitts later served as a colonel in the United States Army during World War II. In late 1958, he had his larynx removed during surgery for cancer. One of his sons, John E. Pitts, Jr. was a brigadier general in the United States Air Force.

Head coaching record

See also
 List of college football head coaches with non-consecutive tenure

Selected works

Notes

References

External links
 

1893 births
1971 deaths
American football centers
Auburn Tigers football coaches
Auburn Tigers football players
All-Southern college football players
Auburn University faculty
United States Army colonels
People from Russell County, Alabama